Růžena Novotná (born January 31, 1941 in Plzeň) is a Czechoslovak retired slalom canoeist who competed in the late 1960s and the early 1970s. She finished 22nd in the K-1 event at the 1972 Summer Olympics in Munich.

References
 Sports-reference.com profile

1941 births
Canoeists at the 1972 Summer Olympics
Czechoslovak female canoeists
Living people
Olympic canoeists of Czechoslovakia
Sportspeople from Plzeň